EnCap Investments is an American private equity firm, specializing in the energy industry, particularly oil & gas. The firm was established in 1988 and is based in Houston, Texas.

History 
In 2012, the company started a $4.3 billion fund to invest in oil and gas. In 2013, EnCap was ranked at #16 Private Equity International's PEI 300 list, with some $11.8 billion under management.

Since its founding, EnCap Investments has raised 18 private equity funds.

In February 2019, Kimbell Royalty Partners acquired certain oil and gas royalty assets from EnCap Investments for $151.3 million in a 100% equity transaction.

In February, 2021, Grayson Mill Energy, a company backed by EnCap Investments, acquired Equinor's oil and gas assets in the Bakken Formation in North Dakota for a reported $900 million. It was reported that Equinor held approximately 242,000 net acres in North Dakota at the time of the sale.

Later that year, the company raised $1.2 billion as part of its transition to clean energy investments, particularly wind and solar power.

References

External links
Official website

Financial services companies established in 1988
Private equity firms of the United States
Mezzanine capital investment firms